Cowboys from Texas is a 1939 American Western "Three Mesquiteers" B-movie directed by George Sherman.

Cast
 Robert Livingston as Stony Brooke
 Raymond Hatton as Rusty Joslin
 Duncan Renaldo as Renaldo
 Carole Landis as June Jones
 Charles Middleton as Kansas Jones
 Ivan Miller as Clay Allison
 Betty Compson as Belle Starkey
 Ethan Laidlaw as Duke Plummer
 Yakima Canutt as Tex Dawson
 Walter Wills as Editor Jeff Morgan
 Ed Cassidy as Cattleman Jed Tyler (as Edward Cassidy)

References

External links
 

1939 films
1939 Western (genre) films
American Western (genre) films
1930s English-language films
American black-and-white films
Films directed by George Sherman
Republic Pictures films
Three Mesquiteers films
1930s American films